The Red in the Sky Is Ours is the debut album by the Swedish death metal band At the Gates released on 27 July 1992. It was re-released in 1993 along with With Fear I Kiss the Burning Darkness and then in 2003 with bonus tracks.

Background information
When At the Gates began recording The Red in the Sky Is Ours, the group had been together for a mere year. In comparison to 1991 EP Gardens of Grief, guitarist Anders Björler feels that The Red in the Sky Is Ours is more structured. In certain instances, Björler deems the record "experimental" nonetheless. At this time, the group's members started to learn about one another musically. Björler was at the time very inspired by guitarist Alf Svensson's ideas, and called them "over the top" and "extremely challenging". However, Björler went on to comment that the group "tried too hard to impress people with too many riffs and weird songwriting".

Björler has criticised the production also, dubbing it "weird" and "very weak-sounding".

Reception
Decibel awarded the album an induction into the Decibel Magazine Hall of Fame in September 2014, becoming the second At the Gates album to receive such award.

Track listing

Credits
At the Gates

Songwriting Credits:
1.	The Red in the Sky Is Ours/The Season to Come - (Björler/Lindberg)/(Traditional)
2.	Kingdom Gone - (Björler, A./Svensson/Lindberg)
3.	Through Gardens of Grief - (Svensson/Björler, A./Lindberg)
4.	Within - (Svensson/Björler/Lindberg)
5.	Windows - (Björler, A./Lindberg)
6.	Claws of Laughter Dead - (Svensson/Björler/Lindberg)
7.	Neverwhere - (Svensson/Lindberg)
8.	The Scar - (Björler, A./Lindberg)
9.	Night Comes, Blood Black - (Svensson/Björler, A./Lindberg)
10.	City of Screaming Statues - (Svensson/Björler, A./Lindberg)

Recording Line-Up:
Tomas Lindberg – vocals
Anders Björler – guitars
Alf Svensson - guitars
Adrian Erlandsson – drums
Jonas Björler - bass
Tony Andersson - bass guitar (credited but does not perform on the album)

Guest musician:
Jesper Jarold – violin on "The Season to Come", "Through Gardens of Grief", "Within" and "Neverwhere"

References

1992 debut albums
At the Gates albums
Peaceville Records albums